Daniel E. Bandmann (November 1, 1837 – November 23, 1905) was an internationally known German-American Shakespearean actor who after retiring from the stage became a noted Montana rancher. In 1885 Bandmann published An Actor's Tour: or, Seventy Thousand Miles with Shakespeare, chronicling his repertoire company's near four-year tour of the Asia-Pacific region over the early 1880s. Bandmann was later credited for introducing McIntosh red apples for cultivation in western Montana.

Early life 
The son of Solomon and Rebecca, Daniel Edward Bandmann was born in Cassel a city in the German State of Hesse. He first came to America in 1852  where at some point he became involved with German amateur theatre productions at New York's Stadt Theatre. During this time Bandmann reportedly attended the Cooper Institute where he studied English under Alexander Graham Bell. This is questionable, since Bell was nearly ten years younger than Bandmann and did not come to America until much later.

As an American citizen, Bandmann returned to Germany in 1858 and shortly thereafter made his professional stage debut at the Court Theatre in Neustrelitz. Later, with the sponsorship of the Grand Duchess of Mecklenburg, Bandmann embarked on a successful series of mostly Shakespearean productions staged in Germany, Prussia and Austria.

Theatrical career
In November 1861 Bandmann returned to New York  where on January 15, 1863, he was well received in his English-language debut at Niblo's Garden as Shylock. Soon his Hamlet gained considerable attention from critics for his introduction of a number of innovations from German theatre, such as bringing his Ghost up from beneath the stage with leaves twitching to and fro matching Hamlet's anxiety. On September 1, 1863, Bandmann appeared at Niblo's in the first performance in New York of John Guido Methua's adaptation from the German of Emil Brachvogel, entitled Narcisse: or, The Last of the Pompadours. Soon afterwards Bandmann began a five-year tour of North America principally in the roles of Hamlet, Shylock, Othello, logo, Gloucester, Macbeth, Benedict and Narcisse.
 
Bandmann made his first appearance in Britain at London's Lyceum Theatre on February 17, 1868, in Narcisse. Over the follow decade Bandmann would embark on tours visiting a number of the principal cities in Australia, New Zealand, the Hawaiian Islands, North America and Great Britain. During this period he performed in front of King Kamehameha V, Brigham Young and Queen Victoria. Bandmann's most ambitious tour sailed from San Francisco late in 1879 and did not return until January 1884, after staging nearly 700 performances in Tasmania, New Zealand, Australia, the Malay Peninsula, China, India and Hawaii.

Bandmann first married Anne Herschel, a native of Davenport, Iowa, on June 22, 1865. His second marriage, in February 1869, was to the British actress Millicent or Melicent Farmer, daughter of Nehemiah Frederick Farmer and Elizabeth Hodgson. Millicent, stage name Milly Palmer (1845–1926), starred in his London production of Narcisse, and is mentioned in James Joyce's Ulysses for her "impersonation" of Prince Hamlet. This union ended a few years later after their Pacific and North American tours and the birth of a daughter and son. Bandmann then had a long relationship with the young Canadian actress Louise Beaudet, a member of his 1879 Asia-Pacific tour. Though it's unclear whether the two ever married, after his marriage to actress Mary Therese Kelly in the early 1890s, Bandmann was obligated to compensate Beaudet to avoid a messy court entanglement. With Mary Kelly, Bandmann had four children born between 1892 and 1905.

Later life
In 1887 Bandmann purchased two ranches near the abandoned settlement of Hell Gate, not far from Missoula, Montana. Though new to ranching, Bandmann would co-found the Montana Board of Horticulture and introduce to the area McIntosh red apples, Percheron horses, Holstein cattle and exotic breeds of chickens and pigs. Today the site of his property is called Bandmann Flats and hosts a golf club.

Death
Bandmann died suddenly at his Montana ranch on November 23, 1905, just a few months after the birth of his last child, and was laid to rest at the Missoula Cemetery.

Maurice Edward Bandmann (1872–1922), his son by Millicent Farmer, later became a theatrical impresario credited with building a number of theatres throughout the Far East. He died in Gibraltar at about age 50.

References

Marriage to Millicent Farmer 9 Feb 1869 https://www.ancestry.com.au/interactive/1623/31280_194689-00217/5857755?backurl=https://www.ancestry.com.au/family-tree/person/tree/51541223/person/26006903320/facts/citation/135119059545/edit/record

External links

1837 births
1905 deaths
American male Shakespearean actors
German emigrants to the United States
German male stage actors
American male stage actors
19th-century American male actors